Frank Nitzinsky (born 14 October 1974), better known by his stage name, Eye-D, is a Dutch drum & bass producer and DJ based in Goes, The Netherlands. He is one-half of hardcore duo, The Outside Agency, alongside DJ Hidden.

History
Eye-D has been an active drum & bass and hardcore DJ/producer since 1991. His professional musical career began with a hardcore release on Mokum Records in 1996. His first drum & bass releases were issued by Kultbox Records in 1998.

Music
Eye-D's musical style is best characterized by its hardcore influences. He has released drum & bass music on record labels such as PRSPCT Recordings, Lost Soul Recordings, Evol Intent Recordings, Black Sun Empire Recordings and Ruff-Teck Records. He has collaborated with artists such as SPL, Black Sun Empire, Counterstrike, and Evol Intent. Eye-D collaborates very frequently with DJ Hidden with whom he forms The Outside Agency. Since the release of The Outside Agency's first EP on Black Monolith Records in 2001, the 'Eye-D' moniker has been limited to his drum & bass material.

DJ performances
Eye-D regularly performs at musical events internationally, both as Eye-D and as part of The Outside Agency. In the Netherlands, Eye-D and DJ Hidden are frequent guests at underground club nights PRSPCT and Smackdown.

Discography
The following is a list drum & bass releases by Eye-D. For hardcore releases, see The Outside Agency on Discogs.com.

Singles & EPs
 1998: We Eat Tulips for Breakfast EP on Kultbox Records
 1999: Down from the Waist Up (Slipgevaar / Eye Design) on Ghetto Safari
 1999: Evil Eye / Enemies on Def Wish Records
 1999: Sabor Natural de Coco (Armalyte / 640K) (with Kid Entropy) on Black Monolith Breaks
 2000: Uridium on Ruff-Teck Records
 2000: Wireless (with Kid Entropy) / Unicorn MF on Piruh Recordings
 2001: Hidden Bassline on Piruh Recordings
 2002: Metric (with Atomly) on Fear Records
 2003: 707 on Semiconscious Media
 2003: Unicorn MF (Black Sun Empire Remix) on Citrus Recordings
 2004: James Brown / Station on Ruff-Teck Records
 2005: Eye-D & Kid Entropy – 640K (DJ Hidden Remix) on Soothsayer Recordings
 2006: Motherfucking Skulls (with Counterstrike) on PRSPCT Recordings
 2007: Joshua's War (with DJ Hidden) on PRSPCT Recordings
 2007: The Grind (with Counterstrike) on PRSPCT Recordings
 2008: Caffeine Overdose '97 (with Squee) on Independenza Recordings
 2008: Domino / Brimstone on PRSPCT Recordings
 2008: Time War / Rock & Roll (with Evol Intent) on Evol Intent Recordings
 2009: Circuitry (with Squee) on PRSPCT Recordings
 2009: Milkshake / Brainfreeze (with Black Sun Empire) on Black Sun Empire Recordings
 2010: Masters of Rave (with SPL) on Hollow Point
 2010: Kings of the Universe EP (with SPL) on Lost Soul Recordings
 2012: Incoming (with SPL) on Hollow Point
 2013: Mission Statement on PRSPCT Recordings

Albums

 2011: Peer to Peer Pressure (with DJ Hidden) on PRSPCT Recordings

Remixes
 2002: Theeq – A15E (Eye-D Remix) on Low Res Records
 2003: Black Sun Empire – Skin Deep (Eye-D Remix) on Citrus Recordings
 2004: Murder Was the Case – Murder Was the Case (Eye-D Remix) on Murder / Eupholus Records
 2005: Ancronix – Shadow Force (Eye-D Remix) on Soothsayer Recordings
 2005: Bombardier – Syn (Eye-D Remix) on Low Res Records
 2005: Kid Entropy – So Far (Eye-D Remix) on Citrus Recordings
 2006: Aggroman – The Dark Side of the Moon (DJ Hidden & Eye-D Remix) on Aural Carnage
 2009: DJ Hidden – The Narrators (Eye-D Remix) on Ad Noiseam

See also
 List of drum & bass artists
 List of drum & bass record labels

References

External links
 
 
 
 
 
 
 Eye-D on Beatport

1974 births
Living people
Club DJs
Dutch drum and bass musicians
Dutch DJs
Dutch record producers
Hardcore techno musicians
People from Goes
Electronic dance music DJs